S. Frank Brock (c. 1880, in Wisconsin or Portland, Oregon  1918) was an American racecar driver who participated in the 1914 Indianapolis 500. Brock was lost at sea off the coast of England in a World War I naval accident.

Indy 500 results

References

Indianapolis 500 drivers
Deaths due to shipwreck at sea
1918 deaths
Racing drivers from Wisconsin
Year of birth uncertain
American military personnel killed in World War I